The Island of reason or the little men is a social comedy in three acts and in prose by French playwright Pierre de Marivaux, represented for the first time 11 September 1727 by the Comédie-Française.

Analysis 
The Island of reason covers the same topics as L'Île des esclaves and develops them further.

The essential defect of The Island of reason was that its representation on stage needed an impossible optical trick: in Marivaux's mind, the characters of the play are dwarfs that grow slowly and reach the size of a man as their reason increases. This effect was impossible to show to the audience, even if they were informed of the fact. They would have to imagine that individuals whose size does not vary in their eyes, are first dwarves at the beginning of the piece, and ordinary men and women at the end.

Marivaux thought that he could remedy this deficiency by placing a prologue at the beginning of his comedy. Also, in the first scene, the governor of the island and his daughter share some observations about the little things that the shipwreck has thrown in their island, and they handle them like the people of Brobdingnag treated Gulliver; but these explanations didn't get enough attention on the subject.

Reception 
Very badly received by the public at the first performance, Island of reason was played only four times. Although it abounds in beautiful details and especially witty spiritual comments, this is less of a play than a philosophical essay. Marivaux wrote a preface in which he acknowledges that the piece is unplayable:

Characters 

Prologue:
 The Marquis
 The Knight
 The Countess
 The Advisor
Play:
 The Governor
 Parmenas, son of the Governor
 Floris, daughter of the Governor
 Blectrue, Advisor to the Governor
 Islander
 A Islander
 Megisti, servant from the island
 Retinue of the Governor
 The Courtier
 The Countess, sister of The Courtier
 Fontignac, Gascon, secretary of The Courtier
 Spinette, following The Countess
 The Poet
 The Philosopher
 The Doctor
 The peasant Blaise

Plot 

On the island of reason all people are reasonable. As the sage Blectrue, advisor to the governor of the island, explains to newcomers, it is women who pay court to the men. When individuals who are not reasonable land there, they lose their size in proportion to their degree of madness. Eight French land in this island: a courtier, his gascon secretary, named Frontignac, a countess and her maid Spinette, a poet, a philosopher, a doctor and a farmer.

In their capacity as French, these characters have become dwarfs on arrival, but they are so in various degrees. One whose size is less affected by Blaise is the peasant, and therefore, he is the most reasonable. Blaise agrees frankly that he often overstepped the rules of temperance, and he often wanted to deceive the purchasers of his products. As he admits his mistakes and takes the resolution to correct them, he grows up in the eyes of his companions.

Once healed, he begins to heal the Gascon, who, accepting sincerely that he was a liar, braggart and flatterer, also resumes his size. The Gascon, in turn, confesses and heals the maid. As for the doctor, who has become almost undetectable, he must promise to stop "curing" his patients and to let them die on their own to recover its size. The Countess must, in turn, has to correct her coquetry, her pride and feigned politeness. She even decides to make a statement to the son of the governor of the island, and she gets back the size she was before the wreck.

The hardest conversion is the one of the courtier, whose secretary has the greatest difficulty in reminding him of his loans, left and right, never returned, his false protestations of friendship, his love of praise. The courtier finally confesses his wrongs, and tending his hand to the farmer and the gascon, who showed them to him. Only the poet and philosopher refuse to admit they were wrong, and remain incurable. Spinette decides, as the Countess, to make a statement and it is well received, and everything ends in marriages.

References 
 Jean Fleury, Marivaux et le marivaudage, Paris, Plon, 1881, p. 85-8.

Further reading 
 Peter Brockmeier, "La Raison en marche: Über Form und Inhalt der Belehrung bei Montesquieu, Marivaux und Voltaire", Europäische Lehrdichtung, Darmstadt, Wissenschaftliche Buchges, 1981, p. 159-73 
 Fabrice Schurmans, "Le Tremblement des codes dans les trois 'Iles' de Marivaux", Revue d'Histoire du Théâtre, juil.-sept 2004, 3 (223), p. 195–212.

External links 

 L’Île de la raison at CÉSAR website

Plays by Pierre de Marivaux
1727 plays